Yalquz Aghaj (also Romanized as Yālqūz Āghāj) is a village in Lakestan Rural District, in the Central District of Salmas County, West Azerbaijan Province, Iran. At the 2006 census, its population was 1,247, in 293 families.

References 

Populated places in Salmas County